Celine Manzuoli (born 20 January 1973) is a retired French Paralympic judoka who competed in international level events. She was a World and European bronze medalist in the women's heavyweight category and has participated at the 2008 and 2012 Summer Paralympics but did not medal.

References

External links 
 
 

1973 births
Living people
Italian emigrants to France
Sportspeople from Rome
Sportspeople from Clermont-Ferrand
Paralympic judoka of France
Judoka at the 2008 Summer Paralympics
Judoka at the 2012 Summer Paralympics